{{Infobox military unit
| unit_name                     = Commando Regiment
| image                         = SLA Commando crest.png
| image_size                    = 150px
| dates                         = 1980 – present
| country                       = 
| branch                        = 
| command_structure             = Commando Brigade
| type                          = Special Operations
| size                          = 4 Regiments, 3000 Personnel
| garrison                      = Ganemulla
| garrison_label                = Regimental Centre
| commander1                    = Col A S P Silva
| commander1_label              = Centre Commandant
| commander2                    = Brig P G P S Rathnayaka
| commander2_label              = Brigade Commander
| commander3                    = WO1 D P I Nilantha Kumara
| commander3_label              = Regimental Sergeant Major 
| colonel_of_the_regiment       = Maj Gen B P S de Silva
| nickname                      = 
| motto                         = නොහැක්කක් නොමැතNohækkak Nomætha (Sinhala: Nothing is Impossible)
| colors                        =  
| colors_label                  = 
| march                         = 
| mascot                        = 
| battles                       = Sri Lankan Civil War
| notable_commanders            = 
| identification_symbol_2       = 
| anniversaries                 = 15 March
}}
The Commando Regiment ( komāndo rejimēnthuwa) is the commando formation of the Sri Lanka Army. The unit specializes in various roles including hostage rescue, counter-terrorism, unconventional warfare, special reconnaissance, counter-insurgency, and personnel recovery. It was formed in 1980 and is based in Ganemulla, a suburb of Colombo.

The Commando Regiment currently consists of four regular battalions organized into the Commando  Brigade, under the operational command of I Corps forming its Special Operations Force along with the Special Forces Regiment.

 History 

In 1977 Lt. General Denis Perera issued a call to combating terrorism in Sri Lanka, a decision was made by the Army HQ to raise a special counter-terrorist unit. Maj. Sunil Peris from 1st Gemunu Watch, Capt. Sarath Handapangoda from 1st Sinha Regiment and three other ranks were selected as a Core Group and training commenced in the Ella Camp, Army Training Centre, Diyatalawa.

On 9 February 1978 the first ever commando training course commenced, Lt U. Edirisinghe and Lt. P. Chandrawansa, and 24 Other Ranks were drawn from the Armoured Corps, Artillery, Engineers, Sri Lanka Light Infantry, Sinha Regiment and the Gemunu Watch on a volunteer basis. Lt Percy Fernando was drawn from Officer Cadet School to assist in training. Lt. Srinath Rajapaksa, Lt. Vijitha Walikala, and four officers volunteered for the second training course conducted at Diyatalawa. All trainees of both courses, except for aforementioned officers, returned to their parent units after training.

A Commando squadron was formed in Gemunu Watch 'B’ Camp at Diyatalawa and Maj S.D. Peiris, GW was appointed officer commanding, and Capt. Sarath Handapangoda was appointed as second in Command. Shortly after that, the squadron received specialised training in anti-terrorist and anti – hijack techniques conducted by the members of the elite Special Air Service of the British Army. The Commandos were later trained in parachuting at Agra, India and they performed their maiden display during Army Day celebrations on 10 October 1980. 4 December 1980, the Squadron moved to its new premises in Ganemulla. In 1981 the Commandos were employed in counter terrorist operations in Jaffna for the first time. It also performs special duties in the Presidential Security Division. To meet the operational requirements the Commando Regiment was expanded and a Commando Brigade was formed on 18 March 1997.4 Commando regiment was formed before the 3 Commando Regiment on 15 March 2003 which is responsible for VIP protection, hostage rescue and anti terrorist tasks and war dog operations. Four groups which were conducting long range patrols since 1995 was converted into the third regiment was formed 1 August 2007 with Maj Uditha Bandara as the Commanding officer.

Organisation
The Commando Regiment consists of four regular battalions. The Regimental Headquarter which includes the Regimental Centre and the Regimental Headquarter Battalion handles administration and welfare while the four regular battalions are organised into the Commando  Brigade (CDO BDE) which comes under the operational command of I Corps.

Functions

Current CR roles are believed to include
 Special Reconnaissance
 Counter Terrorism 
 Hostage Rescue
 Direct Action
 Covert operations
 Air Borne Operations
 Executive protection

 Formations 
 Commando Brigade (CDO BDE)
 1st Commando Regiment
 2nd Commando Regiment
 3rd Commando Regiment
 4th Commando Regiment
 VIP protection group I (Presidential Security)
 VIP protection group II
 Anti hijacking & hostage release group
 War dog group
 Regimental Headquarter Battalion

 Training Schools 
 Commando Regiment Training School, Uva Kudaoya  
 Commando Regiment Specialized Warfare Training School, Vidathalathive, Mannar

Military operations
With the commencement of the 4th phase of the Sri Lankan Civil War (often cited as 4th Eelam war), the Commandos and Special Forces were tasked to conduct deep operations to disrupt and deny the freedom of action of LTTE. Commandos were able to disorientate the LTTE Leadership by conducting Ambushes and Raids by inflicting attrition on LTTE, thus forcing them to deploy more troops for their rear area security. Their operations shaped up the battlefield creating a favorable situation to launch a historical major offensive to liberate Eastern Province from LTTE.  Most of the operations conducted by the Commando Regiment are Covert operations. A successful small group raid was done in 1990 In Mallakam in the Jaffna peninsula. By Delta Patrol of 1st Commando Regiment. Another successful raid was done in Welioya Thannimuruppu Kulam area in 1993 by a small team of Bravo Group of 2nd Commando Regiment. LTTE's Colonel Amudan alias Thambi (tag no 0003) was also killed in 1994 creating a great impact on the chain of command of the LTTE.

Long Range Reconnaissance Patrol

The Long Range Reconnaissance Patrol (LRRP) is a covert operation (black ops) unit of the Sri Lanka Army. This unit is operated under the Directorate of Military Intelligence of the Army and it is  composed of personnel from the Commando Regiment and Special Forces Regiment.

 Operation Thoppigala 
The 3rd Commando Regiment participated in the military offensive which was launched to capture the Thoppigala (Baron's Cap) from LTTE during the period of June/July 2007. They managed to seize the rocky plateau which had been named by the LTTE as Tora Bora. Around 200 LTTE cadres were killed during the entire offensive.Capture of the Unnichchai tank bund 

After a successful operation to capture Vakarai and Sampur by the Special Forces Brigade, the Commandos were tasked to capture the LTTE strongholds around Thoppigala and Narakamulla. Gaining control of the A–5 road which runs from Maha Oya to Batticaloa via Chenkaladi was essential to gaining access to the jungles of Thoppigala. From Pullumale to Black Bridge at Chenkalladi road was totally controlled by the LTTE. Further, the LTTE was operating freely in the jungles between the A−27 and A−5 roads. Hence, it was essential to gain control of this portion of the road and in the jungles, to launch an operation to destroy the bastion of Thoppigala. However, the A-27 road which runs from Maha Oya to Potuvil and the road from Trikonamadu to Kalmunai were controlled by the Army but was vulnerable to the LTTE attacks. After finalizing plans for a major operation, the mobilization of assigned troops commenced in preparation for launching a decisive attack against LTTE strongholds in the theatre. However, intelligence revealed that the LTTE planned to destroy the Unnichchai tank bund if the Security Forces launched an operation to gain control over the area. They intended to inundate the area by destroying the tank bund to destabilize the government and ultimately spoil the security forces' plan. In this backdrop, commandos were tasked to capture the Unichchai Tank bund intact to facilitate the major offensive.  The capture of Unnichchai tank bund was one of the most significant raids conducted by commandos to facilitate break out of the major offensive to capture the LTTE stronghold Thoppigala.

Reconnaissance missionsPeriyamadu rescue''' (22 November 2001): An eight-man Special Mission Patrol(Long Range Reconnaissance Patrol) led by Lieutenant Udesh Rathnayaka was surrounded by the LTTE at Periyamadu, near Tunukkai in Vanni region at least 25  km inside the enemy lines after an anti-personnel mine blast which injured two of them. This special patrol was planned ambush Poonarin - Paranthan road to take high-value terrorist targets at the Poonarin area. Unfortunately, this incident happened at 1945hrs on 21st and the team managed to survive till 1250 hrs on 22 November with one serious casualty. The trapped team was rescued by the Helicopter Squadron(01-Bell 212,2-MI24,1-MI17 Helicopters) of SLAF(Mission Pilot-Fl.Lt. Sudam Kaluaarachchi. It had taken exactly one-hour airborne time which included 28 minutes in LTTE held area and 50 seconds landing, rescue, and take-off time. Four helicopters had flown in at an altitude of 195 feet(treetop level). The whole operation was led by Major. Upali Rajapaksha RWP RSP (2IC-2 CR)of Commando Regiment who launched the operation and inducted to the location by the leading helicopter from Hingurakgoda Air Force base. This mission was conducted under extremely bad weather conditions and this was the first-ever rescue mission of this nature conducted by elite forces of SL Army.

 Parama Weera Vibhushanaya recipients 
 Major G. S. JayanathMajor Jayanath Ginimelage 
 Corporal H. A. Nilantha Kumara
 Sergeant K. G. D. Gunasekara
 Staff Sergeant K. G. N. Perera
 Corporal S. P. M. L. Pushpama

 Notable members 
Major General Janaka Perera – former Chief of Staff of the Sri Lanka Army, a Leader of Operation Riviresa, former Sri Lankan High Commissioner to Australia & Ambassador to Indonesia
Major General Percy Fernando  – former Deputy General officer commanding of 54th Division who fought bravely till last moment during Elephant Pass Debacle in April 2001
Major General Samantha Sooriyabandara – former Commander of 53 Division
Lieutenant Colonel Sunil Peris - First Officer Commanding of the Commando regiment
Snowy (Military dog) – tracking dog; first animal to be awarded a military award in Sri Lanka
Teesha (Military dog) – tracking dog; first dog to successfully complete a high-altitude parachute jump in Sri Lanka

Order of precedence

See also
Military of Sri Lanka
Sri Lanka Air Force Regiment Special Force

Further readingThe Perfect Soldier: Special Operations, Commandos, and the Future of US Warfare by James F. DunniganSri Lanka Army, 50 YEARS ON – 1949–1999'', (1st Edition)

References

External links

 Sri Lanka Army
 Ministry of Defence Sri Lanka

Military special forces regiments
1980 establishments in Sri Lanka
Sri Lanka Army Commando Regiment
Counterterrorism in Sri Lanka
Military counterterrorist organizations
Military units and formations established in 1980
Special forces of Sri Lanka